Pleven Province ( or Плевенска Област) is a province located in central northern Bulgaria, bordering the Danube river, Romania and the Bulgarian provinces of Vratsa, Veliko Tarnovo and Lovech. The province's capital is the city of Pleven.

Naming
The following Bulgarian terms may be used:
 Плевенска област (Plevenska oblast)
 Област Плевен (Oblast Pleven)
 Плевенски окръг (Plevenski okrag), obsolete
 Окръг Плевен (Okrag Pleven), obsolete

Geography
The province is part of the central Danubian Plain. It is crossed from south to north by the rivers Iskar, Vit and Osam (in west-east order); the river valleys are separated by limestone plateaus.

Municipalities

The Pleven province (област, oblast) contains 11 municipalities. The following table shows the names of each municipality in English and Cyrillic, the main town (in bold) or village, and the population of each as of December 2009.

Demographics

The following table represents the change of the population in the province after World War II:

Ethnic groups

Total population (2011 census): 269,752 

Ethnic groups (2011 census):
Identified themselves 240,265 persons:
Bulgarians: 21,612 (91,40%)
Romani:  9,961 (4,15%)
Turks: 8,666 (3,61%)
Others and indefinable: 2,026 (0,84%)
A further 30,000 persons in Pleven Province did not declare their ethnic group at the 2011 census.

According to the 2001 census, the population of the province was 312,018, of which Bulgarians constitute an overwhelming majority of 280,475. 16,931 signed as Turks (though this number very likely also includes Muslim Roma) and 9,777 as Roma.

Languages
According to the 2001 census 283,626 people specified Bulgarian as their mother tongue, 14,947 declared to speak Turkish at home, while the native speakers of Romani were 8,861.

Religion

Religious adherence in the province according to 2001 census:

See also
Provinces of Bulgaria
List of villages in Pleven Province

References

External links
 Pleven Province

 
Provinces of Bulgaria